Lawrence Irving Wilde (born Yuri Boguinia, April 5, 1991), is a composer, educator, violinist, and nyckelharpa player. Wilde has been commissioned by and collaborated with ensembles such as the Kronos Quartet, Eighth Blackbird, JACK Quartet, ÆON Music Ensemble,  Sō Percussion, Tesla Quartet, Aspen Music Festival Orchestra, Moscow String Quartet, Ensemble Mise-En, Juilliard Orchestra, and others.

Early life 
Wilde demonstrated aptitude for music at an early age, excelling as both a violinist and pianist. His musical talents were nurtured by his mother Vivien Wilde (born Natalia Boguinia) who introduced him to an array of musical genres and artists ranging from Led Zeppelin to Ligeti. The family relocated to Boulder, Colorado in 2000. While in Boulder, Wilde was noticed by composer Daniel Kellogg who recognised his compositional abilities and began to teach him composition privately. In 2009, Wilde and his brother Charles were accepted to the Interlochen Center for the Arts.

Education 
Wilde completed his undergraduate studies in music composition at the Juilliard School, where he worked with  Samuel Adler and Christopher Rouse. In 2012, Wilde won the Juilliard Orchestra Competition with his work Margarita at the Ball for piano and orchestra; the work was premiered by the Juilliard Orchestra and pianist Maxwell Foster conducted by Jeffery Milarsky. Upon completing his undergraduate studies at Juilliard, Wilde completed an M.F.A. in music composition at Princeton University, where he worked with Steven Mackey, Dmitri Tymoczko, and Dan Trueman. In 2015, Wilde was named a Bang on a Can Summer Festival Fellow and worked with composers David Lang, Julia Wolfe and Michael Gordon at the Massachusetts Museum of Contemporary Art.

Career 
In 2013, Wilde became "one of the youngest composers ever commissioned by the Kronos Quartet". His music has been programmed at festivals and venues such as the Lincoln Center Out of Doors, Carnegie Hall, Symphony Space, Aspen Music Festival, Tanglewood Music Festival, Cabrillo Festival of Contemporary Music, Bang On A Can Music Festival, Centro Nacional de Difusion Musical, and others. Wilde studies composition privately with Sofia Gubaidulina whose music is the focus of his dissertation at Princeton University. In 2018, Wilde was endorsed by the Arts Council England as an Exceptional Talent.

Awards and commissions 
 2009 ASCAP Morton Gould Young Composer Award.
2010 Young Composer Scholarship to Boston University Tanglewood Institute.
2012 Aspen Music Festival Fellowship.
2013 Kronos Quartet commissions On the Wings of Pegasus
2014 Kronos Quartet commissions Speak, Time
 2014 Paul and Daisy Soros Fellowship.
2015 Bang on a Can Summer Festival Fellowship.
 2017 ASCAP Morton Gould Young Composer Award.

References

1991 births
Living people
21st-century American composers
Juilliard School alumni
American male pop singers
American male songwriters
ASCAP composers and authors
21st-century American male singers
21st-century American singers